Mozambique, officially the Republic of Mozambique, is a country in Southeast Africa. The economy of Mozambique has developed since the end of the Mozambican Civil War (1977–1992), but the country is still one of the world's poorest and most underdeveloped. The resettlement of civil war refugees and successful economic reform have led to a high growth rate: the country enjoyed a remarkable recovery, achieving an average annual rate of economic growth of 8% between 1996 and 2006 and between 6%–7% from 2006 to 2011. Also, more than 1,200 state-owned enterprises (mostly small) have been privatised. Preparations for privatisation and/or sector liberalisation are underway for the remaining parastatal enterprises, including telecommunications, energy, ports, and railways.done

Notable firms 
This list includes notable companies with primary headquarters located in the country. The industry and sector follow the Industry Classification Benchmark taxonomy. Organizations which have ceased operations are included and noted as defunct.

See also 
 List of airlines of Mozambique
 List of banks in Mozambique
 Economy of Mozambique

References 

 
Economy of Mozambique-related lists
 
Mozambique